Elliot Walker is a British sculptor and glassblower and the winner of the second season of the Netflix series, Blown Away.

Education 
He graduated from Bangor University in Wales with a degree in psychology.  He then studied glassmaking in the Historic Glass Quarter in Stourbridge.

Career 
He has been working as an artist since 2009 and works mostly with molten glass using the Massello technique. He worked for Peter Layton as part of his London glass-blowing studio team for eight years before creating his own space to work in Hertfordshire.

Walker opened his first solo show at Messums Wiltshire, at Tisbury on January 26, 2021.  Called Plenty, the show reflects on the culture of excess through sculptures.

He has won the Frederic Stuart memorial fund by the Worshipful Company of Glass Sellers and his work is part of the Broadfield House Museum collection. He won the Craft&Design award at the British Glass Biennale in May 2015.

References 

Glassblowers
 Participants in Canadian reality television series
 21st-century male artists
 Glass makers
British glass artists
Year of birth missing (living people)
Living people